Greatest may refer to:

 Greatest!, a 1959 album by Johnny Cash
 Bee Gees Greatest, a 1979 album by Bee Gees
 Greatest (The Go-Go's album), 1990
 Greatest (Duran Duran album), 1998
 Greatest (song), a song by Eminem
 "Greatest", a song by NEFFEX

See also
 Greatness, a concept of superiority
 The Greatest (disambiguation)
Greatist, a fitness and health website